Denis (or Dennis) Buckley (1844 - July 20, 1864) was a Canadian soldier who fought in the American Civil War. Buckley received the country's highest award for bravery during combat, the Medal of Honor, for his action during the Battle of Peachtree Creek in Georgia on July 20, 1864. He was honored with the award on April 7, 1865.

Biography

Buckley was born in Canada in 1844. He joined the 136th New York Volunteer Infantry from Avon, New York in August 1862. Buckley was killed in action on July 20, 1864 and his remains are interred at the Marietta National Cemetery in Marietta, Georgia.

Medal of Honor citation

See also

 List of American Civil War Medal of Honor recipients: A–F

References

1844 births
1864 deaths
Canadian-born Medal of Honor recipients
Pre-Confederation Canadian emigrants to the United States
People from Kawartha Lakes
People of New York (state) in the American Civil War
Union Army officers
Union military personnel killed in the American Civil War
United States Army Medal of Honor recipients
American Civil War recipients of the Medal of Honor